
Sir Arthur Hodgson KCMG (29 June 1818 – 24 December 1902) was an Australian pioneer and politician.

Early life
Hodgson was born in Rickmansworth, Hertfordshire, England; the second son of the Rev. Edward Hodgson and his third wife Charlotte, daughter of Francis William Pemberton of Bombay, India. Hodgson was educated at Eton from 1828–33 and then entered the Royal Navy and was a midshipman from 1833–37 on HMS Canopus on the China station. In 1837–38 he studied at Corpus Christi College, Cambridge.

Australia
In 1839 Hodgson moved to Australia, arriving in Sydney, and soon leased Cashiobury run in the New England district. In July 1840, he sought new land further north in the Moreton Bay district (as it was then known, now called Queensland)  based on advice from Patrick Leslie. With a partner, Gilbert Eliott, and his brother, Christopher Pemberton Hodgson, Arthur Hodgson squatted Eton Vale, the second pastoral run on the Darling Downs in September 1840. In the 1846 publication, Reminiscences of Australia with Hints on the Squatters' Life, Hodgson's brother describes the conflict involved in the taking of land ownership from Aboriginal Australians. They named this property Etonvale after Eton College, the illustrious school they both attended in England.  The land they marked out was in the possession of the Barunggam people and the book recorded in some detail their "constant skirmishes with the natives" to wrest control of the area, and how "so many hundreds of these poor creatures have been sacrificed". The Hodgson brothers took an active role in the killings. The homestead was decorated with "swords, guns and..all around are displayed spears, boomerangs..dillies and calabashes, the spoil of a hard fought battle or a surprised camp of natives."

In 1842 Arthur Hodgson married the daughter of Sir James Dowling, Chief Justice of New South Wales, which helped advance his position there. In 1856–61 he became general superintendent of the Australian Agricultural Company.

Hodgson represented Clarence and Darling Downs in the New South Wales Legislative Assembly in 1858 and Newcastle in 1859. After the separation of Queensland, he was elected to its Legislative Assembly representing Warrego. Hodgson was minister for public works in the Mackenzie ministry from September to November 1868 and colonial secretary in the Lilley ministry from January to November 1869. He was acting-premier during the visit of the Duke of Edinburgh.

Return to England
In 1870 Hodgson returned to England, settled at Clopton House near Stratford-upon-Avon, of which town he became mayor, and took much interest in the Shakespearian memorials there, and also in the volunteer movement. Hodgson served as High Sheriff of Warwickshire in 1881, as mayor of Stratford from 1883–1888, as well as high steward of the borough from 1884–1889. He represented Queensland at various European exhibitions, and did useful work in helping to develop the Queensland trade in meat and other products. Hodgson was created Companion (CMG) of the Order of St Michael and St George in 1878, and Knight Commander (KCMG) in that Order in 1886 for services in representing Queensland in the exhibitions of Vienna (1873), Paris (1878) and London (1886).

Family
Hodgson married, in 1842, Eliza Dowling, second daughter of Sir James Dowling. They had seven children, including Annie Frances Hodgson, who went on to marry James Wilfred Hewitt, 5th Viscount Lifford.
Lady Hodgson died on 2 May 1902, in her 81st year.  Hodgson died later  that year, at Clopton House on 24 December 1902 and was buried with his wife in Stratford-upon-Avon Cemetery.

Legacy 
The small township of Hodgson in the Maranoa Region, the locality of Hodgson Vale in the Toowoomba Region, and Hodgson Creek in the Toowoomba Region are named in his honour.

References

Further reading

External links

 Grass Dukes and Shepherd Kings, State Library of Queensland
 

1818 births
1902 deaths
People educated at Eton College
Alumni of Corpus Christi College, Cambridge
Members of the New South Wales Legislative Assembly
Knights Commander of the Order of St Michael and St George
People from Rickmansworth
Members of the Queensland Legislative Assembly
19th-century Australian politicians
Sheriffs of Warwickshire
Squatting in Australia
19th-century squatters